Winslow Lake, also known as Long Lake, is a lake near Shawano, Wisconsin in Oconto County, Wisconsin within the watershed of Green Bay of Lake Michigan. Its outflow is the First South Branch Oconto River by which it is connected to the Camp Five Lake. The outline of the Winslow Lake is formed like an H and it reaches from the southwest to the northeast.

References 

Lakes of Wisconsin
Bodies of water of Oconto County, Wisconsin